Parliamentary elections were held in Syria on 24 and 25 September 1954, with a second round held between 4 and 5 October. Independent candidates emerged as the largest bloc in Parliament, whilst the People's Party became the largest single party, with 30 seats. The Muslim Brotherhood did not participate as such. There were 64 independents, of whom some were close to the Muslim Brotherhood or to other parties, which explains the discrepancies in the results in various books, and there were also 9 tribal deputies. Some sources mention 140 deputies in total, other 142.

Results

References

Syria
Parliamentary election
Parliamentary elections in Syria
Election and referendum articles with incomplete results